Otłoczyn  is a village in the administrative district of Gmina Aleksandrów Kujawski, within Aleksandrów County, Kuyavian-Pomeranian Voivodeship, in north-central Poland.

It is known for the Otłoczyn railway accident.

References

Villages in Aleksandrów County